Andy Pilling (born 30 June 1969) is an English retired footballer who played in the Football League for Preston North End and Wigan Athletic.

References

External links
 

1969 births
Living people
Footballers from Wigan
English footballers
Association football midfielders
Preston North End F.C. players
English Football League players
Wigan Athletic F.C. players
Southport F.C. players